This page includes weapons used by both the Ground Forces of the Islamic Republic of Iran Army and the Ground Forces of the Islamic Revolutionary Guard Corps.

From 1925 to the Iranian Revolution in 1979, Iran was primarily equipped with Western hardware and equipment. Cases exist where Iran was supplied with equipment before it was even made standard in the country that developed it (for example the US F-14 Tomcat jet, and the British Chieftain tank). Primary suppliers included the United States, Britain, France, West Germany, Italy, Israel, and the Soviet Union.

The post-revolution sanctions and the Iran–Iraq War had a dramatic effect on Iran's inventory of western equipment. Under the pressures of war, supplies were quickly exhausted and replacements became difficult to come by. The war forced Iran to turn towards Syria,  Brazil  and China to meet its short-term military needs. Initial developments in military technology were carried out with the support of China, North Korea and Russia to lay the foundations for future industries.

Iranian reliance on these countries has rapidly decreased since the 2010s in most sectors whereby Iran has gained almost total independence. However, in some sectors such as aerospace, Iran is still greatly reliant on external sourcing. Iran has developed the capacity to reverse engineer existing foreign hardware, adapt it to its own requirements and then manufacture the finished product. Examples of this are the Boragh IFV. In an attempt to make its military industries more sustainable Iran has also sought to export its military products.

Infantry gear

Infantry weapons

Firearms

Explosives

Vehicles

Combat vehicles

Non-combat vehicles

Artillery

Missiles
This refers to ballistic missiles and not battlefield systems. Iran's missile forces are under the command of the Revolutionary Guards, under the army's authority. Additional information is available at the article Air Force of the Army of the Guardians of the Islamic Revolution, which force operates Iran's long-range missiles. Iran was reported to have purchased 18 mobile Musudan missiles (the extended range version of Soviet R-27 Zyb) with a 3,200-to-4,000 km range in 2005.

Air defence

Aircraft

Helicopters

Transport aircraft 
The IRIA Ground Forces operates an army aviation component comprising the following:

Unmanned aerial vehicles

See also
 Iranian military industry
 List of countries by level of military equipment
Lists of equipment
 List of military equipment manufactured in Iran
 List of aircraft of the Iranian Air Force
 List of aircraft of the Aerospace Force of the Islamic Revolutionary Guard Corps
 List of equipment of the Islamic Republic of Iran Air Defense Force
 List of current ships of the Islamic Republic of Iran Navy
 List of equipment of the Navy of the Islamic Revolutionary Guard Corps
 Tanks of Iran

References

External links
 Manufacturing equipment for the Iranian Army
 Iranian Defense Industries Organization
 Iran – GlobalSecurity.Org
 Iranian Manufactured Assault Rifles

Islamic Republic of Iran Army
Military equipment of Iran
Iranian military-related lists
Iranian Army
Iran